Mercedes del Carmen Guillén Vicente (born 5 June 1954) is a Mexican politician from the Institutional Revolutionary Party. From 2009 to 2012 she served as Deputy of the LXI Legislature of the Mexican Congress representing Tamaulipas. She is the sister of Rafael Sebastián Guillén Vicente, whom the government alleges is the real identity of Subcomandante Marcos, the leader of the EZLN Zapatista guerrilla in Chiapas.

References

1954 births
Living people
People from Tampico, Tamaulipas
Women members of the Chamber of Deputies (Mexico)
Institutional Revolutionary Party politicians
21st-century Mexican politicians
21st-century Mexican women politicians
Members of the Chamber of Deputies (Mexico) for Tamaulipas